The 2016 FINA Swimming World Cup was a series of nine two-day meets in nine different cities between August and October 2016. After switching to long-course (50 meter) pools in the previous year's pre-Olympic season, this edition returned to the usual short-course (25 meter pool) format. Like the previous short course World Cup in 2014, 36 events were scheduled. The total amount of prize money was US$ 2,178,000. The first meet started 13 days after the final day of the Olympic pool swimming program.

Meets

The 2016 World Cup consisted of the following nine meets, which were divided into three clusters. Berlin returned after having been omitted for the last two editions. The other eight cities were the same as the previous year.

World Cup standings
 Composition of points:
 Best performances (by meets): 1st place: 24 points, 2nd place: 18 points and 3rd place: 12 points;
 Points for medals (in individual events): gold medal: 12 points, silver medal: 9 points and bronze medal: 6 points;
 Bonus for world record (WR): 20 points.

Men
Overall top 10:

Women
Overall top 10:

Event winners

50 m freestyle

100 m freestyle

200 m freestyle

400 m freestyle

1500 m (men)/800 m (women) freestyle

50 m backstroke

100 m backstroke

200 m backstroke

50 m breaststroke

100 m breaststroke

200 m breaststroke

50 m butterfly

100 m butterfly

200 m butterfly

100 m individual medley

200 m individual medley

400 m individual medley

4 × 50 m mixed relays

Legend:

References

FINA Swimming World Cup
FINA Swimming World Cup